Stu Silver is an American screenwriter and television writer best known for such films and television series as Throw Momma from the Train, Webster, It's a Living, Bosom Buddies and Soap. Silver also wrote the first half of Good Morning, Vietnam.

References

External links

American male screenwriters
American television writers
American male television writers
Living people
Year of birth missing (living people)